Pomaderris forrestiana is a species of flowering plant in the family Rhamnaceae and is endemic to south-western Australia. It is a low shrub with elliptic leaves, and small clusters of woolly-hairy flowers.

Description
The upper surface is velvety-hairy and the lower surface is covered with grey, woolly, star-shaped hairs. Flowering has been observed in July and September.

Taxonomy
Pomaderris forrestiana was first formally described in 1875 by Ferdinand von Mueller in his Fragmenta Phytographiae Australiae from specimens collected by John Forrest. The specific epithet (forrestiana) honours the collector of the type specimens.

Distribution and habitat
Pomaderris forrestiana grows in rocky and sandy soils on stony hills and coastal limestone south from Kalgoorlie in Western Australia and along the coast of south-western Australia to as far east as near the border between Western Australia and South Australia.

Conservation status
This pomaderris is listed as "not threatened" by the Government of Western Australia Department of Biodiversity, Conservation and Attractions.

References

Flora of South Australia
Flora of Western Australia
forrestiana
Plants described in 1875
Taxa named by Ferdinand von Mueller